Mikhail Igorevich Kuzyayev (born 22 January 1988) is a Russian former professional football player.

Club career
He made his professional debut for FC Saturn Ramenskoye in the return leg of their 2008 UEFA Intertoto Cup matchup against FC Etzella Ettelbruck.

External links
 
 Career summary by sportbox.ru
 

1988 births
People from Moscow Oblast
Living people
Russian footballers
Association football defenders
FC Saturn Ramenskoye players
FC Sheksna Cherepovets players
FC Lada-Tolyatti players
FC Spartak-2 Moscow players
Sportspeople from Moscow Oblast